Johann Friedrich Naumann (14 February 1780 – 15 August 1857) was a German scientist, engraver, and editor. He is regarded as the founder of scientific ornithology in Europe. He published The Natural History of German Birds (1820–1844) and The Eggs of German Birds (1818–1828). His father Johann Andreas Naumann (1744–1826) was a naturalist, and his brother Carl Andreas Naumann (1786–1854) was also an ornithologist.

The German ornithological society named its journal Naumannia. The lesser kestrel (Falco naumanni) is also named for him.

Biography
Johann Friedrich Naumann was born in Ziebigk, about 10 km southeast of Köthen, on 14 February 1780, as the son of Johann Andreas Naumann, a well-known natural historian. After attending school at Dessau, he returned home and devoted himself to the study of agriculture, botany, geology, and ornithology. His later work was devoted more exclusively to the ornithology of Germany. In 1822 he published his Naturgeschichte der Vögel Deutschlands (13 vols, Leipzig (1822), illustrated with plates Naumann engraved himself.  He was also the author of many other ornithological works.

In 1821, Naumann sold his bird collection to Frederick Ferdinand, Duke of Anhalt-Köthen for 2,000 Taler.  He was appointed curator of the ducal collection in the Ferdinandsbau in Schloss (Castle) Köthen, which has been accessible to the public since 1835.

References

Sources
Wilhelm Heß: ADB Vol. 23. Duncker & Humblot, Leipzig 1886, p. 315
Paul Gottschalk: Johann Friedrich Naumann, in: Mitteldeutsche Lebensbilder, Vol. 1, Lebensbilder des 19. Jahrhunderts, Magdeburg 1926, pp. 65–70.

Gallery

External links

German Wikisource has original text related to this article: Johann Friedrich Naumann.
Naumann Museum at Bachstadt-koethen.de
Zoologica Göttingen State and University Library

1780 births
1857 deaths
People from Südliches Anhalt
German ornithologists
German engravers